Sam Pinder (born 15 February 1979 in  Taupo, New Zealand), is a  Scottish rugby union player formerly of Glasgow Warriors and Scotland. Pinder played at Scrum-Half.

The player qualified to represent the Scottish national rugby union team as his grandmother came from Port Seton near Edinburgh. The scrum half played for Scotland against the Barbarians at Murrayfield on 31 May 2006. Pinder got his first of his two international caps on tour for Scotland on 10 June 2006 in Durban; the second on 17 June 2006 in Port Elizabeth; both against South Africa.

He is a Glasgow Warriors centurion having played over 100 matches for the club. He left the club in 2009 to go to Hong Kong where he has been employed in various roles with the Hong Kong RFU notably as running their Sevens team and as being the Director of Rugby at Causeway Bay RFC.

See also
SCAA Causeway Bay RFC

References

1979 births
Living people
Scottish rugby union players
Scotland international rugby union players
Glasgow Warriors players
Glasgow Hutchesons Aloysians RFC players
Ayr RFC players
Rugby union players from Waikato
Rugby union scrum-halves
New Zealand rugby union players
New Zealand people of Scottish descent
Citizens of the United Kingdom through descent
Blues (Super Rugby) players
New Zealand rugby union coaches
Scottish rugby union coaches
Northland rugby union players
New Zealand expatriate sportspeople in Hong Kong
Scottish expatriate sportspeople in Hong Kong